Babuji Ek Ticket Bambai is an Indian Hindi-language social drama film, written by Nazir Qureshi and directed by Arvind Tripathi. The film was scheduled to be released on 6 October 2017, but could never release.

It got released on 26 March 2021, with a new title 'Raag'.

Plot
The film is based on the dehumanising situation that commercially sexually exploited women (CSEW) face in India.  It follows a girl from Bedhiya community from the hinterlands of central India i.e. Bundelkhand region. Their culture is singing and dancing which is called "Rai". Their community is matriarchal and the story is about three generations of a family where the youngest girl Madhu rebels to change the age old tradition through education. But despite her progressive attitude she falls prey to the socio - police - politicon nexus she is married off to Rajjan, a boy from the same village who has intense crush for her from the beginning.

Cast
Rajpal Yadav
Bharti soni
Sudha Chandran
Yashpal Sharma
Mohan Joshi
Rakesh Bedi
Milind Gunaji
Kiran Sharad
Heena Panchal

Soundtrack
The Music Was Composed By Nikhil Kamath, Altaaf Sayyed, Umesh Tarkaswar and Released by T-Series.

References

External links
 

2017 films
2010s Hindi-language films
Films set in Mumbai